Sappe or Sappé may refer to:
 Sapper, a military function
 Ahmed Shafeeq Ibrahim Moosa, a Maldivian politician known as Sappé